The United States Air Force's 2d Command and Control Squadron (2 CACS) was an Air Force Space Command command and control unit located at Falcon AFB (later Schriever AFB), Colorado. The 2 CACS commanded passive surveillance systems supporting USSPACECOM and theater warfighters’ requirements through continuous all-weather, day-night surveillance of on-orbit satellites.

Mission
The 2 CACS was responsible for planning, assessing, and developing execution orders for passive surveillance missions around the world, at locations such as Misawa AB, Japan, Osan AB, Republic of Korea, RAF Feltwell, United Kingdom  and RAF Edzell, United Kingdom.

Information from the sites' Low Altitude Surveillance System (LASS) and Deep Space Tracking System (DSTS) were fed to 2 CACS, which was then forwarded onto the space surveillance center at Cheyenne Mountain AFS, Colorado. The center uses this data, along with data from other sensors, to maintain a catalog of man-made objects in space.

Assignments

Major Command
Air Force Space Command (???- ???)

Previous designations
 2d Command and Control Squadron (???)

Commanders
Lt Col James E. Mackin (c. 1996)
Lt Col T. Clark (c. 1995)

Bases stationed
Schriever AFB, Colorado (???-???)

Equipment Commanded
Low Altitude Surveillance System (???-???)
Detachment 1, 3d SSS - Osan AB, Republic of Korea
5th SSS - RAF Feltwell, United Kingdom
17 SSS - RAF Edzell, United Kingdom
Deep Space Tracking System (???-???)
3d SSS - Misawa AB, Japan
5th SSS - RAF Feltwell, United Kingdom

Decorations
Air Force Outstanding Unit Award 
1 January 1998 – 31 December 1998
1 October 1997 – 30 September 1999
1 October 1995 – 30 September 1997

See also
3d Space Surveillance Squadron
5th Space Surveillance Squadron
17th Space Surveillance Squadron

References

External links
 Western States Legal Foundation: National Security Space Road Map, 1998
 Globalsecurity.org: 21st Space Wing

Military units and formations in Colorado
Command and Control 0002